The , also known as the , was a domain of the Tokugawa Shogunate of Japan during the Edo period from 1583 to 1871.

The Kaga Domain was based at Kanazawa Castle in Kaga Province, in the modern city of Kanazawa, located in the Chūbu region of the island of Honshu. The Kaga Domain was ruled for its existence by the tozama daimyō of the Maeda, and covered most of Kaga Province and Etchū Province and all of Noto Province in the Hokuriku region. The Kaga Domain had an assessed kokudaka of over one million koku, making it by far the largest domain of the Tokugawa shogunate. The Kaga Domain was dissolved in the abolition of the han system in 1871 by the Meiji government and its territory was absorbed into Ishikawa Prefecture and Toyama Prefecture.

History

Maeda Toshiie was a distinguished military commander, a retainer of Oda Nobunaga and a close friend of Toyotomi Hideyoshi. A member of the Council of Five Elders who ruled Japan during the Sengoku period, he was granted the Kaga Domain in 1583. His eldest son, Maeda Toshinaga, supported Tokugawa Ieyasu in his rise to power and was rewarded by an increase in his lands to 1.25 million  koku.

Toshinaga was succeeded by his brother Maeda Toshitsune, who created two cadet branches of the clan:

Toyama Domain (100,000 koku), headed by descendants of Toshitsune's second son Toshitsugu (1617–1674)
Daishōji Domain (100,000 koku), headed by descendants of Toshitsune's fourth son Toshiaki (1638–1692)

A third cadet line was founded by Toshitsune's brother Maeda Toshitaka for his services during the Siege of Osaka. This branch held the Nanokaichi Domain, rated at the minimum of 10,000 koku.

The Maeda clan ruled the Kaga Domain for the entirety of its existence until the abolition of the domains in 1871 after the Meiji Restoration and the overthrow of the Tokugawa Shogunate. The location of the main Edo residence of the Kaga Domain's daimyō is now the site of the Hongō campus of the University of Tokyo.

Holdings
As with most domains in the han system, the Kaga Domain consisted of discontinuous territories calculated to provide the assigned kokudaka, based on periodic cadastral surveys and projected agricultural yields. At the end of the Tokugawa shogunate in 1868, the Kaga Domain consisted of the following holdings:

Kaga Province
 177 villages in Kahoku District (all of district)
 235 villages in Ishikawa District (all of district)
 205 villages in Nomi District (all except 18 villages)
Noto Province
 177 villages in Hakui District (all of district)
 128 villages in Kashima District (all of district)
 229 villages in Fugeshi District (all of district)
 75 villages in Suzu District (all except one village, which was shared)
Etchū Province
220 villages in Imizu District (all of district)
490 villages in Tonami District (all of district)
409 villages in Niikawa District (all of district)
Ōmi Province
3 villages in Takashima District

List of daimyōs

Genealogy 
The clan records were preserved over the course of centuries.

 I. Toshiie, 1st daimyō of Kaga (cr. 1583) (1539–1599; r. 1583–1599)
 II. Toshinaga, 2nd daimyō of Kaga (1562–1614; r. 1599–1605)
 III. Toshitsune, 3rd daimyō of Kaga (1594–1658; r. 1605–1639)
 IV. Mitsutaka, 4th daimyō of Kaga (1616–1645; r. 1639–1645)
 V. Tsunanori, 5th daimyō of Kaga (1643–1724; r. 1645–1723)
 VI. Yoshinori, 6th daimyō of Kaga (1690–1745; r. 1723–1745)
 VII. Munetoki, 7th daimyō of Kaga (1725–1747; r. 1745–1747)
 VIII. Shigehiro, 8th daimyō of Kaga (1729–1753; r. 1747–1753)
 IX. Shigenobu, 9th daimyō of Kaga (1735–1753; r. 1753)
 X. Shigemichi, 10th daimyō of Kaga (1741–1786; r. 1754–1771)
 XII. Narinaga, 12th daimyō of Kaga (1782–1824; r. 1802–1822)
 XIII. Nariyasu, 13th daimyō of Kaga (1811–1884; r. 1822–1866)
 XIV. Yoshiyasu, 14th daimyō of Kaga, 14th family head (1830–1874; r. 1866–1869; Governor: 1869–1871; family head: 1869–1874)
 Yoshitsugu, 15th family head, 1st Marquess (1858–1900; 15th family head 1874–1900, Marquess: 1884).
  XI. Harunaga, 11th daimyō of Kaga (1745–1810; r. 1771–1802).
Toshiaki, 4th daimyō of Kaga-Daishōji (1691–1737)
Toshimichi, 5th daimyō of Kaga-Daishōji (1733–1781)
Toshitoyo, 9th daimyō of Etchū-Toyama (1771–1836)
Toshihiro, 11th daimyō of Ueno-Nanokaichi (1823–1877)
Toshiaki, Governor of Nanokaichi, 1st Viscount (1850–1896; Governor of Nanokaichi 1869–1871, created 1st Viscount 1884)
Toshinari, 16th family head, 2nd Marquess (1885–1942; 16th family head and 2nd Marquess 1900–1942)
Toshitatsu, 17th family head, 3rd Marquess (1908–1989; 17th family head 1942–1989, 3rd Marquess 1942–1947)
Toshihiro, 18th family head (1935– ; 18th family head 1989–)
Toshitaka (1963–)
Toshikyo (1993–)

See also 
 List of Han
 Abolition of the han system

References

Further reading
Brown, Philip C. (1993). Central authority and local autonomy in the formation of early modern Japan: the case of Kaga domain. Stanford, California: Stanford University Press. 
Chūda Toshio 忠田敏男 (1993). Sankin kōtai dōchūki: Kaga-han shiryō o yomu 参勤交代道中記: 加賀藩史料を読む. Tokyo: Heibonsha 平凡社.
Flershem, Robert G., and Yoshiko N. Flershem (1980). Kaga, a domain which changed slowly. Hamburg: Gesellschaft für Natur und Völkerkunde Ostasiens.
McClain, James L. (1982). Kanazawa : a seventeenth-century Japanese castle town. New Haven: Yale University Press.

Domains of Japan
Maeda clan